Thor Vilhjálmsson (12 August 19252 March 2011) was an Icelandic writer. He was born in Edinburgh, Scotland. Over the course of his life Vilhjálmsson wrote novels, plays, and poetry and also did translations. In 1988 he won the Nordic Council Literature Prize for his novel Justice Undone (Icelandic: Grámosinn glóir). In 1992, he won the Swedish Academy Nordic Prize, known as the 'little Nobel'.

Bibliography (partial)
1950 Maðurinn er alltaf einn
1954 Dagar mannsins
1957 Andlit í spegli dropans
1968 Fljótt, fljótt sagði fuglinn
1970 Óp bjöllunnar
1972 Folda : þrjár skýrslur
1975 Fuglaskottís
1976 Mánasigð
1977 Skuggar af skýjum
1979 Turnleikhúsið
1986 Grámosinn glóir (English translation Justice Undone )
1989 Náttvíg
1994 Tvílýsi
1998 Morgunþula í stráum
2002 Sveigur

References

External links

Site on Icelandic writers

Icelandic writers
Icelandic male poets
Nordic Council Literature Prize winners
Vilhjalmsson, Thor
Vilhjalmsson, Thor
Writers from Edinburgh
Icelandic expatriates in Scotland
20th-century Icelandic poets
20th-century male writers
Thors family